The Great Lakes Bat Festival is an annual two-day summer event that started in 2002.1 It has been held at the Cranbrook Institute of Science Bat Zone in Bloomfield Hills, Michigan2, at the Indiana State University Center for North American Bat Research and Conservation in Terre Haute, Indiana3, at the Milwaukee County Zoo in Milwaukee, Wisconsin, and in Iron Mountain, Michigan near Millie Hill Mine4.

The goal of the Great Lakes Bat Festival is to bring attention to the diversity of life on earth, teach people about the importance of bats, explain the need for conservation, and give people the tools to make a positive change in their local environment. The festival includes live bat programs presented by the Organization for Bat Conservation featuring bats from around the world, including North American insect-eating bats, South American leaf-nosed bats, and giant Asian fruit bats!

Events and Highlights of the Great Lakes Bat Festival include: Great Lakes Region expert presentations about the benefits of bats, bat houses, bat research, bat conservation, public health, endangered species, and much more. The festival has hosted films, authors, bat house and bat detector building workshops, educational exhibits, mine tours, children's activities, and live animal programs.

Evening events include bat researchers erecting a mist net to catch local bats, bat detection devices, research techniques, radio-tagging and/or light-tagging.

Special Guests and Speakers include:
Jannell Cannon (Artist & Author of award-winning book Stellaluna), Fiona Reid (Artist & Author), Bill Schutt (author of the critically acclaimed book "Dark Banquet"), Dr. John Whitaker, Jr. (Indiana State University), Dr. Al Kurta (Eastern Michigan University), Dr. Tim Carter (Ball State University), Rob Mies (Organization for Bat Conservation), Bill Scullon (Michigan Department of Natural Resources), Mike Frayer (Milwaukee County Zoo) and many others.

Bat Festivals are held in other regions of the US, as well. The annual ( Austin Bat Festival) is held at the end of each summer, at the famous Congress Avenue Bridge in Austin, Texas.

References

1 Organization for Bat Conservation, Bat Conservation Journal, Spring 2008 Issue

2 Cranbrook Institute of Science, www.PureMichigan.org/Things-to-Do/Events "Great Lakes Bat Festival at Cranbrook Institute of Science."

3 Indiana State University (May 21, 2007), ISU News Archive: ISU Newsroom, "Great Lakes Bat Festival To Take Place at ISU in August"

4 Richard Morscheck (July 25, 2005), Enviro-Mich "E-M:/Fourth Annual Great Lakes Bat Festival"

5 Michigan Department of Natural Resources, The Spotting Scope, Fall 2005, Vol.11 No.1 "Thousands Gather for 2005 Bat Festivals"

External links
Official website

Great Lakes
Bat conservation